Adelie Land is a meteorite discovered on December 5, 1912, in Antarctica by Francis Howard Bickerton (1889-1954), a member of Sir Douglas Mawson's Australasian Antarctic Expedition. It was named after Adélie Land and it was the first meteorite found in Antarctica.

It was classified as L5 ordinary chondrite. The meteorite is roughly 3.49 Ga old.

See also
Glossary of meteoritics

References

External links
Report by amonline.net.au

Meteorites found in Antarctica
1912 in Antarctica
Adélie Land
Australasian Antarctic Expedition